John Taylor (12 January 1908 – 4 November 1989) was a Canadian cross-country skier. He competed in the men's 18 kilometre event at the 1932 Winter Olympics.

References

1908 births
1989 deaths
Canadian male cross-country skiers
Olympic cross-country skiers of Canada
Cross-country skiers at the 1932 Winter Olympics
Skiers from Toronto